Harold L. Peet (April 19, 1896 – February 20, 1965) was an American politician who served in the New York State Assembly from the Wyoming district from 1951 to 1964.

References

1896 births
1965 deaths
Republican Party members of the New York State Assembly
20th-century American politicians